Algassimou Baldé (born 11 October 1984) is a Guinean former professional footballer who played as an attacking midfielder. He has spent all of his career in France.

Personal life
Born in Thiès, Senegal, Baldé holds citizenship from France, Guinea, and his country of birth Senegal.

References

External links
 
 

1984 births
Living people
Guinean people of Senegalese descent
Naturalized citizens of Guinea
Sportspeople from Thiès
French sportspeople of Senegalese descent
Guinean footballers
Association football midfielders
Guinea international footballers
US Torcy players
Racing Club de France Football players
Angers SCO players
US Raon-l'Étape players
AS Beauvais Oise players
AS Cannes players
SC Toulon players
R.C.S. Verviétois players
Entente SSG players
FC Fleury 91 players
ES Viry-Châtillon players
CS Meaux players
Paris 13 Atletico players
Guinean expatriate footballers
Guinean expatriate sportspeople in France
Expatriate footballers in France